Narcissus tip necrosis virus (NTNV)  is a plant pathogenic virus of the family Tombusviridae, which infects plants of the genus Narcissus, the only known host.

Description 
NTNV disease appears after flowering with large necrotic lesions which appear first near the leaf tips ('tip necrosis').

Taxonomy 
Narcissus tip necrosis virus was isolated in 1972. At the 1987 ICTV meeting, that proposed the genus Carmovirus, Narcissus tip necrosis virus was listed as a 'tentative' member but as of the 2013 release it has still not been officially accepted. Note that the ICTV does not track tentative members, so there are no further records in their databases, though still listed as tentative in the current Ninth Report (2009).

References

External links
 ICTVdB Index of Viruses 2002. Tombusviridae
 Eighth Report of the ICTV, 2005. p. 926

Viral plant pathogens and diseases
Tombusviridae